Susan Stewart Harrison (August 26, 1938 – March 5, 2019) was an American actress. She is most famous for her appearance in the 1957 film noir classic Sweet Smell of Success as the sister for whom Burt Lancaster has an unhealthy affection, and in The Twilight Zone episode "Five Characters in Search of an Exit".

Early life
Harrison was a graduate of the High School of Performing Arts in New York City, where she played Frankie in Member of the Wedding by Carson McCullers and Eliza Doolittle in George Bernard Shaw's Pygmalion. She attended Boston University, briefly studying under Peter Kass, who directed her in the role of Abigail in Arthur Miller's The Crucible.

Career
Her professional debut was in the live television drama Can You Coffeepot on Skates?, presented in 1956. This was followed by television appearances on Matinee Theatre and Alfred Hitchcock Presents and her cinematic debut in Sweet Smell of Success. On October 19, 1957, she opened on Broadway at the Bijou Theater, playing "the Girl" in William Saroyan's new play The Cave Dwellers to uniformly good reviews. The following year she was in the Playhouse 90 production of In Lonely Expectation, which brought her to the attention of Rod Serling and led to her role as the ballerina in the iconic Twilight Zone episode. She had several later television and stage roles, most notably in an episode of the television show Bonanza, "Dark Star" in the first season, chapter 31. In 1960 she played Ruby, the female lead, in the little-seen film Key Witness with Jeffrey Hunter and Dennis Hopper.

Retirement from acting
By 1963 she had left public life and acting and devoted herself to her family, although in the 1990s she played Elberta in a Jackson County Stage Company (Carbondale, Illinois) production of Mixed Couples. She since appeared at various film and science fiction conventions, and she was involved in the Actors Studio until failing vision and health left her unable to participate.

Personal life
She was the mother of Darva Conger, an Air Force veteran who became known as the winner of the reality television show Who Wants to Marry a Multi-Millionaire? but returned to a private life and worked as a Certified Registered Nurse Anesthetist in California. Harrison had two other children, Dev Colin, a pilot for United Airlines, and Daniel Colin (died 2000). She also had three grandchildren, Cassius Arellano, Chase Colin, and Naomi Colin.

Filmography

1960 Bonanza - Der schwarze Stern

References

External links

1938 births
2019 deaths
People from Leesburg, Florida
Boston University alumni
American stage actresses
American television actresses
Actresses from Florida
20th-century American actresses
21st-century American women